BOTB may refer to:

 Battle of the Bands, a music competition involving two or more bands
 Battle of the Bands (disambiguation), various other topics
 "Battle of the Bastards", an episode of the hit series Game of Thrones
 Best of the Best (disambiguation), various topics
 Battle of the Blades, a Canadian television figure skating competition broadcast by CBC
 Besses o' th' Barn, an area within the Metropolitan Borough of Bury in Greater Manchester, England

See also
 BtoB (disambiguation), meaning "business-to-business", "back-to-back", or various other things